Patricia Johnson may refer to:
Patricia Johnson (mezzo-soprano) (born 1934), English operatic mezzo-soprano
Patricia Altenbernd Johnson, professor of philosophy at University of Dayton
Mark A. Michaels and Patricia Johnson, writers on sexuality and relationships
Trish Johnson (born 1966), English professional golfer
Patricia J. Johnson, professor at UCLA
Patty Van Wolvelaere or Patty Johnson (born 1950), American hurdler
Patricia Johnson, Miss North Carolina for 1969

See also
Patricia Johnston, lyricist "I'll Remember April"
Pat Johnson (disambiguation)